South Fork High School (SFHS) is a public high school in Stuart, Florida, United States. It is part of the Martin County School District.

The school's mascot is the Bulldog, and its colors are black, red and white. South Fork has its own on-campus golf course. There is also an on-campus farm used for cattle and citrus groves, a football/track stadium, tennis and volleyball courts, and a baseball/softball field.

South Fork High is the only high school in the Martin County School District with the International Baccalaureate Diploma Programme.

Notable alumni
Cleveland Gary, NFL running back
Tony DiTerlizzi, co-author of seriesThe Spiderwick Chronicles
Alicia Minshew, actress
Charles Emanuel, NFL safety 
Beverly McClellan, finalist in the first season of The Voice
Corey McIntyre, NFL fullback

References

External links
  South Fork Home Page
 Martin County School District

High schools in Martin County, Florida
Martin County School District
Public high schools in Florida
1982 establishments in Florida
Educational institutions established in 1982